The Thomas A. Edison Career and Technical Academy is a four-year public high school in Elizabeth in Union County, New Jersey, United States, serving students in ninth through twelfth grades as part of the Elizabeth Public Schools. The school is the primary center for vocational and technical education in the city. Williams' Field, which holds the school's football field and outdoor track field, is adjacent to Thomas A. Edison Academy. The school is accredited by the Middle States Association of Colleges and Schools Commission on Elementary and Secondary Schools since 1946.

Thomas A. Edison High School was built in 1935 and named for the inventor who worked on many of his major contributions to the scientific and commercial world working in New Jersey.

As of the 2021–22 school year, the school had an enrollment of 823 students and 51.0 classroom teachers (on an FTE basis), for a student–teacher ratio of 16.1:1. There were 495 students (60.1% of enrollment) eligible for free lunch and 62 (7.5% of students) eligible for reduced-cost lunch.

Awards, recognition and rankings
The school was the 323rd-ranked public high school in New Jersey out of 339 schools statewide in New Jersey Monthly magazine's September 2014 cover story on the state's "Top Public High Schools", using a new ranking methodology. The school had been ranked 327th in the state of 328 schools in 2012.

Curriculum
The Thomas A. Edison Career and Technical Academy serves students in grades 9-12 divided into small learning communities. The program is designed to provide a high degree of academic rigor as well as prepare students to learn a skilled trade. In addition to coursework in their chosen field of study, students will complete a rigorous academic curriculum that includes classes in English, Mathematics, Science, Social Studies, and World Language. Honors and AP courses will be offered to all interested students. Students enrolled in the Academy are expected to perform community service and comply with all rules, regulations and policies of the Academy and the district, including the mandatory wearing of school uniforms.

The career and technical program comprises four themes:

 Construction Technology prepares students for a career in construction (carpentry; electrical trades; heating, ventilation, and air conditioning; and plumbing), architecture, and engineering
 Health Science prepares students for a career in patient care, nursing, radiology, medicine technology, and healthcare administration
 Automotive Technology prepares students for the latest in automotive diagnostics, mechanics, operations, and repairs
 Hospitality and Retail Services prepares students to enter into the management and marketing field, sales, customer service, entrepreneurship, restaurant management, and food service.

The Elizabeth Public Schools is partnering with The National Academy Foundation and has been engaged in a Year of Planning - Academy Development Process to establish the Academy of Hospitality & Tourism as a career academy at the Thomas A. Edison Career and Technical Academy in September 2010. The Academy of Hospitality & Tourism helps students chart career paths in one of the world's largest industries, from hotel management to sports, entertainment, and event management, and includes the study of geography, economics, and world cultures.

Administration
Core members of the school's administration are:
Fatimah Bey, Principal
Faye Best, Vice Principal
Mona Wanis, Vice Principal - 9th Grade Academy Annex Building

Notable alumni
Marsha P. Johnson (1945–1992), gay liberation activist and self-identified drag queen.

References

External links
School website

1935 establishments in New Jersey
Education in Elizabeth, New Jersey
Educational institutions established in 1935
Public high schools in Union County, New Jersey